This is list of tallest structures in Indonesia by height.

See also
List of tallest buildings in Jakarta
List of tallest buildings in Indonesia

Indonesia